María Belén Arrojo Jiménez (born 8 January 1995) is a Spanish basketball player who plays for Lointek Gernika Bizkaia and the Spanish national team. She is considered one of the most promising young players of Spanish basketball.

Club career
Arrojo moved from her natal Granada to Barcelona to play for Segle XXI at 14, and she progressed to play in the (Spanish second tier league) from 2011 to 2013. Since 2013 she has played in the (Spanish top tier league) in different clubs.

EuroLeague and EuroCup statistics

National team
Arrojo started playing with Spain's youth teams at 15, winning a total of five medals from 2010 to 2015. She made her debut with the senior team in 2015, when she was 20 years old.

 5th 2010 FIBA Europe Under-16 Championship (youth)
  2011 FIBA Europe Under-16 Championship (youth)
 5th 2012 FIBA Europe Under-18 Championship (youth)
  2012 FIBA Under-17 World Championship (youth) 
 4th 2013 FIBA Under-19 World Championship (youth) 
  2013 FIBA Europe Under-18 Championship (youth)
  2014 FIBA Europe Under-20 Championship (youth)
  2015 FIBA Europe Under-20 Championship (youth)
  2018 World Championship

References

External links

1995 births
Living people
Small forwards
Spanish women's basketball players
Sportspeople from Granada